La peste (The Plague) is a Spanish historical drama television series created by Alberto Rodríguez and Rafael Cobos for Movistar+. It tells a crime story set in the 16th century Seville during an outbreak of the bubonic plague. The series premiered on 12 January 2018 on Movistar+'s VOD service and on #0. Before it first aired, on 30 September 2017, it was announced that it had been renewed for a second season, which premiered on 15 November 2019.

Premise

"During an outbreak of the bubonic plague in the magnificent Seville of 1597, Mateo, a former soldier, returns, honouring his word to find and extract a dead friend’s son from the city. Previously, Mateo had been forced to flee the city to save his life, having been sentenced to death by the Inquisition for printing forbidden books. Before he can complete his task, Mateo is arrested by the Inquisitor’s bailiffs, who promise to pardon his life in exchange for solving a series of crimes of diabolic overtones being committed in Seville."

Cast 

Introduced in season 2

Production
The second season was shot in Cuevas del Almanzora, Almería, from 15 October 2018 to 19 October.

Episodes

Season 1

Season 2

References

External links

La peste (Serie de TV) on Filmaffinity

Spanish-language television shows
2010s Spanish drama television series
2018 Spanish television series debuts
Television series about the history of Spain
Television shows set in Seville
Television series set in the 16th century
Movistar+ network series
Television series about viral outbreaks